Rabies is a 1958 Swedish television drama film directed by Ingmar Bergman.

Cast
 Bibi Andersson as Eivor
 Axel Düberg as Cpl. Sven
 Åke Fridell as Sixten Garberg
 Tor Isedal as Knut
 Åke Jörnfalk as Rolf
 Gunnel Lindblom as Jenny
 Dagny Lind as Aunt
 Nils Nygren as Cronswärd
 Toivo Pawlo as Wholesaler
 Marianne Stjernqvist as Mrs. Svensson
 Folke Sundquist as Erik
 Max von Sydow as Bo Stensson Svenningson

References

External links

1958 films
1950s Swedish-language films
1958 drama films
Swedish black-and-white films
Swedish television films
Films directed by Ingmar Bergman
1950s Swedish films